The 2011–12 season was the 80th season in NK Varaždin (1931–2015) history and their twenty-first in the Prva HNL. Their 11th-place finish in the 2010–11 season means it was their 21st successive season playing in the Prva HNL.

This was a season of highs and lows for the club. A year earlier, in mid-2010, the club had lost its sponsor of 52 years, the Varteks clothing factory, and had changed its name from NK Varteks to NK Varaždin. The loss of their main sponsor severely impacted the club's finances. Offsetting this was their success in the first two Qualifying Rounds of the 2011–12 UEFA Europa League, being knocked out by one goal, on aggregate, in the Third Qualifying Round, played in August 2011. However, as the Prva HNL season progressed, their continued financial difficulties, including missing salary payments to its players, led to it being suspended by the Croatian Football Federation, in spring 2012, for their 23rd and 24th matches. This triggered a Federation rule that led to Varaždin being suspended from the Prva HNL for the remaining matches of the 2011–12 season. Under the rules, the club was immediately relegated to the lowest football level possible of the Croatian football league system, being the seventh-tier Third League of Varaždin County, for the 2012–13 season.

While the club was reinstated to the 3. HNL for the 2103–14 season, its continued financial woes saw the then 74-year-old organisation declare bankruptcy, and cease to exist, at the end of the 2014–15 season.

First-team squad

Competitions

Overall

Prva HNL

Classification

Results summary

Results by round

Matches

Pre-season

Prva HNL

* Varaždin was suspended and thus unable to play the match so the game was awarded 3–0
† After failing to play two matches in Prva HNL, Varaždin was expelled and all their remaining matches were awarded as a 3–0 forfeit win to opponents

Europa League

Croatian Cup

Player seasonal records
Competitive matches only. Updated to games played 24 March 2012.

Top scorers

Source: Competitive matches

Disciplinary record
Includes all competitive matches. Players with 1 card or more included only.

Sources: Prva-HNL.hr, UEFA.com

Appearances and goals

Sources: Prva-HNL.hr, UEFA.com

References

Croatian football clubs 2011–12 season
NK Varaždin seasons
Varazdin